The Central District of Jask County ( is a district (bakhsh) in Jask County, Hormozgan Province, Iran. At the 2006 census, its population was 28,807, in 5,854 families.  The District has one city: Jask.  The District has three rural districts (dehestan): Gabrik Rural District, Jask Rural District, and Kangan Rural District.

References 

Districts of Hormozgan Province
Jask County